The Karabaw Festival (English: Carabao Festival; Filipino: Písta ng Kalabaw) is a festival of Gandara, Samar, Philippines.

References

Cultural festivals in the Philippines